Tourist Bus Simulator is a bus simulator game developed by TML-Studios and published by Aerosoft for Microsoft Windows. The game is powered by Unreal Engine 4 and was initially available on 6 December 2018 worldwide.

Gameplay

The game is set in Fuerteventura of the Canary Islands, featuring a total of twenty recreated cities, beaches and locations such as the Fuerteventura Airport. The main licensed vehicle in the game that offers to the player is MAN Lion's Coach, as well as other off-road and service vehicle.

Development and release
The game is developed with Unreal Engine 4 by the German-based game studio TML-Studios, who had previously released Fernbus Simulator. The game was initially released for Microsoft Windows on 6 December 2018. The console versions of PlayStation 5 and Xbox Series X/S were launched on 12 May 2022.

References

External links 

  

2018 video games
Bus simulation video games
Open-world video games
PlayStation 5 games
Single-player video games
TML-Studios games
Unreal Engine games
Video games developed in Germany
Video games set in Spain
Windows games
Xbox Series X and Series S games